Amy is a feminine given name.

Amy or AMY may also refer to:

Comics
Amy (comic strip), created by Harry Mace in 1962
Amy (The Walking Dead), a fictional character in the comic book and television series The Walking Dead

Computing and technology
AMY (scientific instrument), a particle detector used at the TRISTAN collider
Amy (video game), a 2012 survival horror video game
 Atari AMY, a single-chip synthesizer originally designed at Atari

Film
Amy (1981 film), an American film directed by Vincent McEveety
Amy (1984 film), a British television film based on the life of aviator Amy Johnson
Amy (1997 film), an Australian film directed by Nadia Tass
Amy (2015 film), a British documentary based on the life of Amy Winehouse

Music
Amy Records, an American record label
Amy (soundtrack), from the 2015 film, by Antônio Pinto and Amy Winehouse
 "Amy", a song by Elton John from Honky Château, 1972
 "Amy", a song by Green Day from ¡Dos!, 2012
 "Amy", a song by Yuna and Masego from Rouge, 2019

Places
Amy, Arkansas, US
Amy, Kansas, US
Amy, Mississippi, US
Amy, Missouri, US
Amy, Oise, France, a commune

Other uses
 Amy (demon), in demonology, a goetic demon
 AMY Awards, or the Australian Interactive Media Industry Association Awards
 Ambatomainty Airport (IATA airport code)
 Amberley railway station (National Rail code)
 Tropical Storm Amy (disambiguation)

See also
 
 
 
 Ami (disambiguation)
 Amie (disambiguation)
 Ammi (disambiguation)